Provincial Highway 7 is a highway connecting Daxi, Taoyuan and Zhuangwei, Yilan. The highway is also known as Northern Cross-Country Highway, one of the three most important east–west highways in Taiwan.

Route description
The highway begins at the junction of Highway 3 in Daxi. The route then passes through Cihu Mausoleum, the tombs of the late presidents Chiang Kai-shek and Chiang Ching-Kuo. After the intersection with Highway 7B, the route enters the aboriginal district of Fuxing in Taoyuan City. At Luofu village (羅浮, Rahao) in Fuxing, the highway passes through the intersection with County Road 118, a popular scenic route also known as LuoMa Highway (羅馬公路).

Starting from Fuxing, the road becomes a narrow and winding 1-lane highway as it crosses the Central Mountain Range. The highway passes through numerous tribal villages along the way. The highway then enters Datong, Yilan, which is also an aboriginal township. At Datong, the highway passes through Mingchi Forest Recreational Area (明池國家森林遊樂區) and Qilan Forest Recreational Area (棲蘭國家森林遊樂區). The highway has a junction with Highway 7a in the Qilan area and another with Highway 7c near Yingshi village (英士村), both located in Datong. The highway then follows the Lanyang River and continues to Yuanshan, Yilan and Yilan City. At Yilan City, the highway intersects with PH 9 and Freeway 5 before ending at PH 2 in Zhuangwei. At some points (such as in Sileng (roughly at the 58-59km mark)) the road has an elevation of 1170 meters.

Spur routes
 The highway runs from its parent route at Qilan in Datong, Yilan to PH 8 at Lishan (梨山) in Heping District. It is also known as the Yilan branch of the Central Cross-Island Highway (中橫公路宜蘭支線). The total length is 73.988 km.
 The highway runs from PH 3 in Sanxia, New Taipei City to its parent route in Fuxing District. It was assigned as a part of Highway 7 until the segment between Daxi and Fuxing opened. The total length is 14.15 km.
 The highway runs from its parent route in Datong, Yilan to Highway 2e in Wujie, Yilan, passing through Sanxing, Yilan, Dongshan, Yilan, and Luodong, Yilan. The highway links the township in central Yilan plains to the cross-island highway. The total length is 31.337 km.
 The highway runs from Yuanshan, Yilan to Yilan City. It was originally planned to extend to Wulai, New Taipei City but was not built. The total length is 16.153 km.

External links
 http://www.thb.gov.tw/ Directorate General of Highways, MOTC, Taiwan

Highways in Taiwan